(7888) 1993 UC is a near-Earth minor planet in the Apollo group.  It was discovered by Robert H. McNaught at the Siding Spring Observatory in Coonabarabran, New South Wales, Australia, on 20 October 1993. The asteroid has an observation arc of 23 years and has a well determined orbit. Its estimated size is 2.3 to 5.2 km.

The approach posed no threat to Earth. (7888) 1993 UC is not classified as a potentially hazardous asteroid (PHA) because its Earth MOID (Minimum Orbit Intersection Distance) is only 0.089 AU, and only objects with an Earth MOID less than 0.05 AU are considered PHAs.

It was discovered to be a binary asteroid by Arecibo Observatory in March 2013.

On 29 April 2146, the asteroid will pass  from asteroid 4 Vesta.

References

External links 
 Asteroids with Satellites, Robert Johnston, johnstonsarchive.net
 
 
 

007888
Discoveries by Robert H. McNaught
007888
007888
20130315
19931020